Husseyn Langah I (reigned 1456–1502) was the second ruler of Langah Sultanate. He undertook military campaigns in Punjab and captured Chiniot and Shorkot. He was a Jat ruler according to H.G. Raverty.

References

15th-century Indian monarchs
Year of birth missing
1502 deaths